Haribhau Joshi (died 17 December 2009)  was a leader of Bharatiya Janata Party. He was Education minister in Government of Madhya Pradesh. He represented Susner assembly constituency in the Madhya Pradesh Legislative Assembly. He died in 2009. He was a well Known poet. His poetry writings can be found in his book "Jijivisha".

References

2009 deaths
State cabinet ministers of Madhya Pradesh
Bharatiya Jana Sangh politicians
Madhya Pradesh MLAs 1977–1980
People from Agar Malwa district
Year of birth missing
Bharatiya Janata Party politicians from Madhya Pradesh